This is a list of years in Pakistan. See also the timeline of Pakistani history.

21st century

20th century

See also
 Timeline of Karachi
 Timeline of Lahore
 Timeline of Peshawar

 
Pakistan history-related lists
Pakistan